Judith Wiesner was the defending champion, but lost in the final 4–6, 6–1, 6–3 to Naoko Sawamatsu. Curiously, both players faced each other at the final match in last year.

Seeds
The first five seeds received a bye to the second round.

  Pascale Paradis-Mangon (quarterfinals) took the designated seed spot after Pierce's withdrawal, without being recognized as the 9th seed.

Draw

Finals

Top half

Bottom half

References

External links
 Official results archive (ITF)
 Official results archive (WTA)

Internationaux de Strasbourgandnbsp;- Singles
1993 Singles
1993 in French tennis